Fagasa may refer to:
 Fagasa, Samoa
 Fagasā, American Samoa